Overcoming Life's Disappointments is a 2006 book by Harold Kushner, a Conservative rabbi.  Kushner addresses in the book the question of how to cope when disappointing things happen to you. He uses Biblical examples, such as how Moses coped with being denied entrance to The Promised Land, as well as secular examples, such as how Abraham Lincoln coped with depression. The emphasis is on the common disappointments faced by many throughout life, such as the breakup of a marriage, death of a loved one, loss of a job, or financial reversals.

Rabbi Kushner's book was a New York Times bestseller for many months in the "nonfiction" category.

Recognition
New York Times bestseller, "nonfiction"

References

External links
 Rabbi Harold Kushner talks and gives stories in relation to his latest book Overcoming Life's Disappointments (video)

2006 non-fiction books
Religious studies books